Liotrichus is a genus of beetles belonging to the family Elateridae.

The species of this genus are found in Eurasia and Northern America, Southern Africa.

Species:
 Liotrichus affinis (Paykull, 1800)

References

Elateridae
Elateridae genera